Karoline Mischek (born 22 May 1998) is an Austrian table tennis player. Her highest career ITTF ranking was 108.

References

1998 births
Living people
Austrian female table tennis players